Southside is the second studio album by American singer Sam Hunt. It was released through MCA Nashville on April 3, 2020. It was slated to be supported by the Southside Summer Tour 2020, which would have featured guests Kip Moore, Travis Denning, Brandi Cyrus, and Ernest, and was set to begin in Charlotte, North Carolina, on May 28, 2020, but canceled due to the COVID-19 pandemic.

Background
Following the success of Hunt's debut album Montevallo, released in 2014, Hunt sporadically released several singles while delaying his second studio album. In the years between, he released the massive hit "Body Like a Back Road", "Downtown's Dead", as well as the track "Drinkin' Too Much". Hunt gave little details on when his second album would be released until the release of "Kinfolks" in October 2019, when he stated the full album would be released in 2020 and followed it up with the release of the track "Sinning with You" in January 2020. In February 2020, Hunt finally revealed the album title Southside as well as an April 2020 release date. The track "Hard to Forget" was soon released to coincide with the beginning of pre-orders, and was later announced to be the next single.

Critical reception

Southside was met with generally positive reviews. At Metacritic, which assigns a normalized rating out of 100 to reviews from mainstream critics, the album holds an average score of 72 based on six reviews.

Writing for Rolling Stone, Jon Freeman highlighted the "thread of sensitivity" in Southside and opined that the album made Hunt "a crossover star." Chris DeVille of Stereogum positively compared the album to Montevallo, praising how the former contains "ever more adventurous packaging and a more seasoned perspective". In concurrence, Pitchforks Natalie Weiner stated that the album "shows a clarity of purpose that his debut lacked" while also praising Hunt's "enviably organic" way of threading "the country/hip-hop needle". In a mixed review, Seth Wilson of Slant Magazine took note of the album's "ingratiating charm" but criticized its lyrical content. Robert Christgau awarded the album an A− grade in his online subscription letter praising in particular Hunt's "way with words" prevailing throughout the record, citing the chorus of 'Body Like a Back Road' as an example of his words cherishing "the American vernacular that imbues great pop songwriting from Irving Berlin to Jay-Z in a Nashville dialect that recalls John Prine".

Rankings

Commercial performance
Southside debuted at number five on the US Billboard 200, opening with 46,000 album-equivalent units, including 18,000 pure album sales. It earned the third-largest streaming week for a country album, and is Hunt's second US top-10 album.

Track listing

Personnel
Adapted from Southside liner notes.

Gideon Boley – pedal steel guitar (track 3)
Tim Braisted – bass guitar (track 8), background vocals (track 10)
Josh Burkett – electric guitar (track 8), guitar (track 5)
Bryce Cain – acoustic guitar (track 10), keyboards (track 10), programming (track 10)
Tyrone Carreker – electric guitar (track 8), background vocals (track 10)
Jamil Chammas – electric guitar (track 8)
Dave Cohen – keyboards (track 10)
Zach Crowell – bass guitar (track 3), acoustic guitar (track 6), keyboards (tracks 2–7, 9, 11, 12), programming (all tracks), background vocals (tracks 2–6, 8, 9)
Ian Fitchuk – keyboards (tracks 5, 8), organ (track 5)
Jeneé Fleenor – fiddle (tracks 2, 4, 9)
Jerry Flowers – background vocals (track 3)
Charlie Handsome – acoustic guitar (track 8), programming (track 8)
Sam Hunt – guitar (track 5), lead vocals (all tracks)
Evan Hutchings – drums (track 8)
Chris LaCorte – banjo (track 7), acoustic guitar (tracks 3, 7), electric guitar (track 7), keyboards (track 3)
Luke Laird – acoustic guitar (track 2), electric guitar (track 2), programming (track 2)
Devin Malone – cello (track 12), acoustic guitar (tracks 1, 4, 9, 11), electric guitar (tracks 3, 4, 8, 11), guitar (tracks 5, 12), pedal steel guitar (tracks 3, 9, 12)
Josh Matheny – dobro (tracks 3, 7, 11), acoustic guitar (track 3)
Anthony Olympia – dobro (track 8)
Josh Osborne – guitar (track 5), background vocals (tracks 3, 5)
Justin Ostrander – electric guitar (track 8)
Russ Pahl – dobro (track 2), pedal steel guitar (tracks 1, 2, 6, 7, 11)
Sol Philcox-Littlefield – electric guitar (track 4)
Joshua Sales – drums (tracks 5, 8)
Scotty Sanders – dobro (track 5), pedal steel guitar (tracks 5, 8)
Jimmie Lee Sloas – bass guitar (tracks 1, 3, 4)
Bryan Sutton – acoustic guitar (tracks 1, 10)
Russell Terrell – background vocals (track 1)
Ilya Toshinsky – banjo (tracks 3, 4), dobro (track 3), acoustic guitar (tracks 2–4, 11), electric guitar (tracks 8, 11)
Derek Wells – electric guitar (track 3)
Nir Z. – drums (tracks 3, 4)

Charts

Weekly charts

Year-end charts

Certifications

Release history

Notes

References

2020 albums
Albums produced by Shane McAnally
Albums produced by Zach Crowell
MCA Records albums
Sam Hunt albums
Contemporary R&B albums by American artists